The Season of Summer (also known by various Syriac transliterations such as Kaitha or Qaita) is a liturgical season in the East Syriac Rite of Christianity. The season begins on the seventh Sunday after Pentecost (just after the conclusion of the Season of Apostles) and continues for seven weeks. The Season of Summer has a theme of spiritual harvest, reflecting on the fruits of the missionary labors of the Apostles.

Fridays of Summer 

The Fridays of various weeks of this liturgical season are dedicated to various martyrs.

 First Friday of Summer: St. James of Nisibis
 Second Friday of Summer: St. Mari
 Fifth Friday of Summer: St. Simoni and seven sons
 Sixth Sunday of Summer: St. Simon Barsaba and co-martyrs

References 

Liturgical seasons